A shareholder (in the United States often referred to as stockholder) of a corporation is an individual or legal entity (such as another corporation, a body politic, a trust or partnership) that is registered by the corporation as the legal owner of shares of the share capital of a public or private corporation. Shareholders may be referred to as members of a corporation. A person or legal entity becomes a shareholder in a corporation when their name and other details are entered in the corporation's register of shareholders or members, and unless required by law the corporation is not required or permitted to enquire as to the beneficial ownership of the shares. A corporation generally cannot own shares of itself.

The influence of a shareholder on the business is determined by the shareholding percentage owned. Shareholders of a corporation are legally separate from the corporation itself. They are generally not liable for the corporation's debts, and the shareholders' liability for company debts is said to be limited to the unpaid share price unless a shareholder has offered guarantees. The corporation is not required to record the beneficial ownership of a shareholding, only the owner as recorded on the register. When more than one person is on the record as owners of a shareholding, the first one on the record is taken to control the shareholding, and all correspondence and communication by the company will be with that person.

Shareholders may have acquired their shares in the primary market by subscribing to the IPOs and thus provided capital to the corporation. However, most shareholders acquire shares in the secondary market and provided no capital directly to the corporation. Shareholders may be granted special privileges depending on a share class. The board of directors of a corporation generally governs a corporation for the benefit of shareholders.

Shareholders are considered by some to be a subset of stakeholders, which may include anyone who has a direct or indirect interest in the business entity. For example, employees, suppliers, customers, the community, etc., are typically considered stakeholders because they contribute value or are impacted by the corporation.

Types 
A beneficial shareholder is the person or legal entity that has the economic benefit of ownership of the shares, while a nominee shareholder is the person or entity that is on the corporation's register of members as the owner while being in reality that person acts for the benefit or at the direction of the beneficial owner, whether disclosed or not.

Primarily, there are two types of shareholders.

Ordinary shareholders 
An individual or legal entity that owns ordinary shares of a company (in the United States commonly referred as common stock) is usually referred to as an ordinary shareholder. This type of shareholding is the most common. Ordinary shareholders have the right to influence decisions concerning the company by participating at general meetings of the company and in the election of directors and can file class action lawsuits, when warranted.

Preference shareholders 
Preference shareholders are owners of preference shares (in the United States commonly referred as preferred stock). They are paid a fixed rate of dividend, which is paid in priority to the dividend to be paid to the ordinary shareholders. Preference shareholders usually do not have voting rights in the company.

Rights 
Subject to the applicable laws, the rules of the corporation and any shareholders' agreement, shareholders may have the right:
 To sell their shares.
 To vote on the directors nominated by the board of directors.
 To nominate directors (although this is very difficult in practice because of minority protections) and propose shareholder resolutions.
 To vote on mergers and changes to the corporate charter.
 To dividends if they are declared.
 To access certain information; for publicly traded companies, this information is normally publicly available.
 To sue the company for violation of fiduciary duty.
 To purchase new shares issued by the company.
 To vote on & file shareholder resolutions.
 To vote on management proposals.
 To what assets remain after a liquidation.

The above-mentioned rights can be generally classified into (1) cash-flow rights and (2) voting rights. While the value of shares is mainly driven by the cash-flow rights that they carry ("cash is king"), voting rights can also be valuable. The value of shareholders' cash-flow rights can be computed by discounting future free cash flows. The value of shareholders' voting rights can be computed by four methods:
 The difference between voting shares and non-voting shares (dual-class approach).
 The difference between the price paid in a block-trade transaction and the subsequent price paid in a smaller transaction on exchanges (block-trade approach).
 The implied voting value obtained from option prices.
 The excess lending fee over voting events.

See also

 Beneficial ownership
 Business valuation
 Class action
 Class A share
 Class B share
 Corporate governance
 Employee stock ownership
 Investor
 Real party in interest
 Shareholder value
 Social ownership
 Street name securities

References

Business terms
 
Stock market